The following is a list of the monastic houses in Tyne and Wear, England.

See also
 List of monastic houses in England

Notes

References

Medieval sites in England
Tyne and Wear
Lists of buildings and structures in Tyne and Wear
Tyne and Wear